The Gârbova is a right tributary of the river Mureș in Transylvania, Romania. It discharges into the Mureș in Țifra, south of Aiud.

References

Rivers of Romania
Rivers of Alba County